Vintage Cellars is an Australian liquor chain owned by Coles group and is  compared to Liquorland and First Choice Liquor, the Coles group's other liquor brands. The chain comprised 83 stores as at June 2018.

References

1951 establishments in Australia
Retail companies established in 1951
Alcohol distribution retailers in Australia
Coles Group
Wine retailers